The 2019 season was the 143rd season of competitive soccer in Canada.

National teams 

When available, the home team or the team that is designated as the home team is listed in the left column; the away team is in the right column.

Senior Men

2019–20 CONCACAF Nations League qualifying 

 qualifies for the 2019 CONCACAF Gold Cup and the 2019–20 CONCACAF Nations League (League A).

2019 CONCACAF Gold Cup 

 eliminated in the quarter-finals.

2019–20 CONCACAF Nations League 

 qualifies for the 2021 CONCACAF Gold Cup.

Senior Women

2019 Algarve Cup 

 finishes in  third place.

2019 FIFA Women's World Cup 

 eliminated in the round of 16.

Friendlies

Men's domestic club leagues

Canadian Premier League 

Seven teams play in this league, all of which are based in Canada. It is considered a Division 1 men's league in the Canadian soccer league system.

League1 Ontario (Men) 

16 teams play in this league, all of which are based in Canada.  It is considered a Division 3 men's league in the Canadian soccer league system.

Première Ligue de Soccer du Québec 

Nine teams play in this league, all of which are based in Canada.  It is considered a Division 3 men's league in the Canadian soccer league system.

Canadian Soccer League 
 
Sixteen teams play in this league, all of which are based in Canada. It is a Non-FIFA league previously sanctioned by the Canadian Soccer Association and is now a member of the Soccer Federation of Canada (SFC).

First Division  
 
Second Division

Men's international club leagues

Major League Soccer 

Three Canadian teams (Montreal Impact, Toronto FC, and Vancouver Whitecaps FC) play in this league, which also contains 21 teams from the United States.  It is considered a Division 1 men's league in the United States soccer league system.

Overall standings

USL Championship 

One Canadian team (Ottawa Fury FC) plays in this league, which also contains 35 teams from the United States.  It is considered a Division 2 men's league in the United States soccer league system.

USL League One 

One Canadian team (Toronto FC II) plays in this league, which also contains nine teams from the United States.  It is considered a Division 3 men's league in the United States soccer league system.

USL League Two 

Five Canadian teams play in this league, which also contains 69 teams from the United States.  It is unofficially considered a Division 4 men's league in the United States soccer league system.

Heartland Division -  Thunder Bay Chill, WSA Winnipeg

Northwest Division -  Calgary Foothills FC, TSS FC Rovers, Victoria Highlanders

Women's club leagues

National Women's Soccer League 

No Canadian teams play in this league, though players from the Canada women's national soccer team are allocated to its teams by the Canadian Soccer Association.  It is considered a Division 1 women's league in the United States soccer league system.

United Women's Soccer 

Two Canadian teams (Calgary Foothills WFC and Queen City United SC) play in this league, which also contains 27 teams from the United States.  It is unofficially considered a Division 2 women's league in the United States soccer league system.

League1 Ontario (Women) 

14 teams play in this league, all of which are based in Canada.  It is considered a Division 3 women's league in the Canadian soccer league system.

Première Ligue de soccer du Québec (Women) 

Six teams play in this league, all of which are based in Canada.  It is considered a Division 3 women's league in the Canadian soccer league system.

Domestic cups

Canadian Championship 

The Canadian Championship is a national cup contested by men's teams in divisions 1 through 3.

Challenge Trophy 

The Challenge Trophy is a national cup contested by men's teams at the division 4 level and below.

Jubilee Trophy  

The Jubilee Trophy is a national cup contested by women's teams at the division 4 level and below.

Canadian clubs in international competition

2019 CONCACAF Champions League 

 Toronto FC loses 5–1 on aggregate.

2019 CONCACAF League

Preliminary round

Round of 16

References

External links 
 Canadian Soccer Association

 
Seasons in Canadian soccer
2019 sport-related lists